UNIMA (Union Internationale de la Marionnette - International Puppetry Association) was founded in Prague in 1929 (the then Czechoslovak magazine Loutkář was UNIMA's first official journal in years 1929–1930). In 1981, the French puppeteer Jacques Félix moved UNIMA's headquarters to Charleville-Mézières, France, location of the Festival Mondial des Théâtres de Marionnettes since 1972. UNIMA is affiliated to UNESCO and it is a member of the International Theatre Institute.

National centers 

There are National centers throughout the world, which include:
 UNIMA-USA founded by Jim Henson in 1966. In 1992  the Center for Puppetry Arts in Atlanta became the headquarters for UNIMA-USA
 UNIMA Australia
 UNIMA Pakistan
 British UNIMA
 UNIMA France - THEMAA
UNIMA Spain

UNIMA World Congresses 
World congresses have been held in: 
 1929: Prague (Presidency: Jindřich Veselý)
 1929: Paris
 1930: Liège
 1933: Ljubljana (New presidency: Josef Skupa) (New General Secretary: Jan Malík)
 1957: Prague (New presidency: Max Jacob)
 1958: Bucharest
 1960: Bochum-Braunschweig
 1962: Warsaw
 1966: Munich
 1969: Prague (New presidency: Jan Bussell)
 1972: Charleville-Mézières (New General Secretary: Henryk Jurkowski)
 1976: Moscow (New presidency: Sergej Obrazcov)
 1980: Washington D.C. (New General Secretary: Jacques Felix)
 1984: Dresden (New presidency: Henryk Jurkowski)
 1988: Nagoya
 1992: Ljubljana (New presidency: Sirppa Sivori-Asp)
 1996: Budapest
 2000: Magdeburg (New presidency: Margareta Niculescu)
 2004: Rijeka (New presidency: Massimo Schuster) (New General Secretary: Miguel Arreche)
 2008: Perth (New presidency: Dadi Pudumjee) (New General Secretary: Jacques Trudeau)
 2012: Chengdu
 2016: Tolosa
 2020: Bali : Holds non-face-to-face online a year later because of COVID-19
 2025: To be held in Chuncheon

See also

 Puppetry
 World Puppetry Day
 Kenya Institute of Puppet Theatre (KIPT)

References

External links 

 British UNIMA

 
Arts organizations established in 1922